Göttingen is a university city in Lower Saxony, Germany.

Göttingen may also refer to:
Göttingen (album), a 2021 live album by Cecil Taylor
"Göttingen" (song), a 1964 single by Barbara
Göttingen (Langenau), a village in eastern Baden-Württemberg, Germany
Göttingen, a village in Lahntal, Hesse, Germany